Pentaerythritol tetrakis(3,5-di-tert-butyl-4-hydroxyhydrocinnamate) is a chemical compound composed of 4 sterically hindered phenols linked through a pentaerythritol core. It is used as primary antioxidant for stabilizing polymers, particularly polyethylene and polypropylene.

Synthesis
It may be produced by the transesterification of 3-(3,5-ditert-butyl-4-hydroxyphenyl)propanoate esters with pentaerythritol.

Properties
The linking of phenols together with pentaerythritol maintains their activity with greatly reduced volatility. This is important during the processing and molding steps where the plastic is heated to molten, typically several hundred degrees.

See also 
 Irganox 1098

References

Phenol antioxidants